Electronic benefit transfer (EBT) is an electronic system that allows state welfare departments to issue benefits via a magnetically encoded payment card used in the United States. It reached nationwide operations in 2004. The average monthly EBT payout is $125 per participant.

Benefits provided via EBT are of two types: food, and cash. Food benefits are federally authorized benefits that can be used only to purchase food and non-alcoholic beverages. Food benefits are distributed through the Supplemental Nutrition Assistance Program (SNAP), formerly the Food Stamp Program. Cash benefits include state general assistance, Temporary Assistance for Needy Families (TANF) benefits, and refugee benefits.

Usage

Through EBT, a recipient uses their EBT card at participating retailers to purchase food items authorized by the USDA's SNAP program.  Cash benefits may be used to purchase any item at a participating retailer, as well as to obtain cash-back or make a cash withdrawal from a participating ATM.

State agencies work with contractors to procure their own EBT systems for delivery of SNAP and other state-administered benefit programs. In the United States, all SNAP benefits are now being issued via EBT.

For example, recipients apply for their benefits in the usual way, by filling out a form at their local food stamp office or online. Once eligibility and level of benefits have been determined, information is transferred to the state's EBT contractor. Once they are approved for benefits, an account is established in the recipient's name, and their SNAP benefits are deposited electronically in this account each month. A plastic debit card is issued and a personal identification number (PIN) is assigned or chosen by the recipient to control access to their account.  

All states have systems that use magnetic stripe cards and "on-line" authorization of transactions. When paying for groceries, the SNAP customer's card is run through an electronic reader or a point of sale terminal (POS), and the recipient enters the PIN to access the food stamp account. Then, electronically, the processor verifies the PIN and the account balance, and sends an authorization or denial back to the retailer. The recipient's account is then debited for the amount of the purchase, and the retailer's account is credited. No physical money changes hands. Payment is made to the retailer through an ACH settlement process at the end of the business day.  Most states' online EBT systems are interoperable through the Quest network, which is sponsored by the Electronic Benefits and Services Council (formerly the EBT Council) of NACHA.

Many states stagger the issuing of benefits to EBT SNAP accounts, with the particular day of the month determined for each recipient based on the case number, Social Security number, or date of birth. The states of Alaska, Idaho, Nevada, North Dakota, Oklahoma, Vermont, along with Guam and the US Virgin Islands, credit accounts on the first of the month to all recipients, New Hampshire credits on the 5th, and South Dakota on the 10th.

For most of its history, the Food Stamp Program used paper denominated stamps or coupons worth US$1 (brown), $5 (blue), and $10 (green). In the late 1990s, the food-stamp program was revamped, and stamps were phased out in favor of a specialized debit-card system known as electronic benefit transfer (EBT) provided by private contractors. Many states merged the use of the EBT card for public-assistance welfare programs as well. The 2008 farm bill renamed the Food Stamp Program as the Supplemental Nutrition Assistance Program (as of October 2008), and replaced all references to "stamp" or "coupon" in federal law to "card" or "EBT."

Taxation 

It is illegal for anyone to charge sales tax, surcharges or card processing fees from an EBT SNAP account, according to federal law and USDA SNAP Guidelines. New state and federal law grants new provisions to law enforcement and state agencies to investigate the criminal use, including taxation on EBT purchases, of state and federal benefits.

References

External links
 
 App to "Access HRA" (NYC) 

Payment systems
Federal assistance in the United States
Supplemental Nutrition Assistance Program